The Catamount Cup (also known as the Sheraton/TD Bank Catamount Cup for sponsorship reasons) is an annual men's college ice hockey tournament hosted by the University of Vermont in Burlington, Vermont. The tournament is contested by the Vermont Catamounts and three visiting teams. Since the inaugural tournament in 1990, it has been held on and off either just before or after New Year's Eve.

As opposed to most in-season tournament, all Catamount Cup games are scheduled before the tournament begins and there is no formal championship game. If teams are tied in record at the end of the tournament goal differential is used as the tie-breaker.

Yearly results

Appearances

External links
Catamount Cup archive at the College Hockey Historical Archives

Vermont Catamounts ice hockey
College ice hockey tournaments in the United States
Ice hockey competitions in Vermont